Tribunj is a village and a municipality in Šibenik-Knin County, Croatia. It is located about three kilometers northwest of Vodice and is known for its peaceful waterfront cafes. The municipality has only one settlement, Tribunj and a hamlet Sovlje, to the west. The municipality was formed in 2006, when the village of Tribunj separated from the Town of Vodice. Tribunj is the birthplace of famous pop-folk artist Mišo Kovač.

History 
The town has been known in medieval ages as Jurjevgrad, it has a small peninsula connected to mainland with an old stone bridge.
Every year at summer, Tribunj organises a Regional Donkey Race which has people racing on donkeys.

Sport 
 NK Mladost Tribunj is from Tribunj.

References

External links 
Općina Tribunj
Turistička zajednica
Kulturna udruga "Tribunj"

Municipalities of Croatia
Populated places in Šibenik-Knin County